This is a list of video game franchises, organized alphabetically. All entries include multiple video games, not counting ports or altered re-releases.

0–9

1080° Snowboarding
1942
3D Ultra Minigolf
3-D Ultra Pinball
7th Dragon

A

A Boy and His Blob
Ace Attorney
Ace Combat
ActRaiser
Adventure Island
Adventures of Lolo
Aero Fighters
Aero the Acro-Bat
After Burner
Age of Empires
Age of Wonders
Airforce Delta
Aleste
Alex Kidd
Alien Breed
Alien Syndrome
Alone in the Dark
Alpine Racer
Altered Beast
Alundra
American McGee's Alice
America's Army
Amnesia
Amped
Angry Birds
Animal Crossing
Anno
Anomaly
Another Century's Episode
Another Code
Ape Escape
Arc the Lad
Arkanoid
ARMA
Armored Core
Army Men
Army of Two
Art Academy
Ar Tonelico
Asheron's Call
Asphalt
Assassin's Creed
Assault Heroes
Asteroids
Astro
Atelier
ATV Offroad Fury
Audiosurf
Avadon

B

Babylonian Castle Saga
Backyard Sports
Baldur's Gate
Bangai-O
Banjo-Kazooie
Baraduke
Bard's Tale
Baseball Stars
Bases Loaded
Batman
Battle Arena Toshinden
Battlefield
Battle Isle
Battlestations
Battletoads
Battlezone
Bayonetta
Beat Hazard
Beatmania
Bendy
Bejeweled
Big Brain Academy
Bionic Commando
BioShock
Bit.Trip
The Black Mirror
Black & White
Blaster Master
BlazBlue
Blazing Angels
Blinx
Blitz: The League
Blood
Blood Bowl
BloodRayne
Bloody Roar
Blue Dragon
Bobby Carrot
Boktai
Boku no Natsuyasumi
Bomberman
Bomb Jack
Bonk
Boom Blox
Border Break
Borderlands
Bosconian
Boulder Dash
BoxBoy!
Brain Age
Bravely
Breakout
Breath of Fire
Broken Sword
Brothers in Arms
Bubble Bobble
Bubsy
Budget Cuts
Burgertime
Burnout
Bushido Blade
Bus Simulator
Buster Bros.
Bust a Groove
Buzz!

C

Cabela's
Call of Duty
Call of Juarez
Candy Crush
Cannon Fodder
Capcom Vs. SNK
Carmageddon
Car Mechanic Simulator
Carmen Sandiego
Carnival Games
Castle Shikigami
Castlevania
Centipede
Championship Manager
Chaos Rings
Chase H.Q.
Chessmaster
Chibi-Robo!
Chivalry
Choplifter
Chrono
City Connection
Civilization
ClayFighter
Clicker Heroes
Clock Tower
Clockwork Knight
Clubhouse Games
Colin McRae Rally
Colony Wars
Columns
Combat Mission
Command & Conquer
Commandos
Company of Heroes
Condemned
The Conduit
Conker
Contra
Cooking Mama
Cool Boarders
Corpse Party
Cotton
Counter-Strike
Crackdown
Crash Bandicoot
Crazy Castle
Crazy Taxi
Creatures
The Crew
Crimson Skies
Croc
Cruis'n
Crusader Kings
Crush Pinball
Crysis
The Culling
Custom Robo
Cut the Rope
Cyber Sled

D

D
Dance Central
Dance Dance Revolution
Danganronpa
Darius
Dark Cloud
The Dark Pictures Anthology
Dark Seed
Dark Souls
Darksiders
Darkstalkers
Daytona USA
DC Comics
de Blob
Dead Frontier
Dead Island
Deadly Premonition
Dead or Alive
Dead Rising
Dead Space
Dead to Rights
Deathsmiles
DeathSpank
Deer Hunter
Defense Grid
Def Jam
Defender
Delta Force
Densha de Go!
Descent
Desperados
Destroy All Humans!
Deus Ex
Devil Children
Devil May Cry
Diablo
Dies irae
Dig Dug
Dino Crisis
Disaster Report
Disgaea
Dishonored
Disney Infinity
Dizzy
Donkey Kong
DonPachi
Doom
Dota
Double Dragon
Dragon Age
Dragon Ball
Dragon Buster
Dragon Force
Dragon Quest
Dragon Slayer
Dragon Spirit
Dragon's Lair
Drakengard
Drawn to Life
Dream Chronicles
Driver
Duke Nukem
Dungeon Defenders
Dungeon Explorer
Dungeon Keeper
Dungeon Siege
Dying Light
Dynasty Warriors

E

Earth Defense Force
Earthworm Jim
Ecco the Dolphin
El Dorado Gate
The Elder Scrolls
Elevator Action
Empire Earth
Eternal Champions
Etrian Odyssey
Europa Universalis
EverQuest
Everybody's Golf
Evil Genius
The Evil Within
eXceed
Excite
Exerion
Exit
EyeToy

F

F1 Circus
F-Zero
Fable
Fallout
Famicom Grand Prix
Famicom Tantei Club
Family Game Night
Family Party
Family Stadium
The Fancy Pants Adventures
Fantasy Zone
Far Cry
Far East of Eden
Farming Simulator
Fatal Frame
Fatal Fury
Fat Princess
F.E.A.R.
Fieldrunners
FIFA
Fighting Vipers
Final Fantasy
Final Lap
Fire Emblem
Five Nights at Freddy's
FlatOut
Flowers
Football Manager
Forza
Fossil Fighters
Frequency
Frogger
Front Mission
Frostpunk

G

Game Party
G-Police
Gabriel Knight
Gal Gun
Galaxian
Galaxy Force
Game Tengoku
Ganbare Goemon
Gauntlet
Gears of War
Gekisha Boy
Geneforge
Genpei Tōma Den
Geometry Wars
The Getaway
Gex
Ghosts 'n Goblins
Giana Sisters
Giga Wing
Glory of Heracles
God Eater
God of War
Golden Axe
Golden Sun
The Golf Club
Golly! Ghost!
Gothic
Gradius
Gran Turismo
Grand Theft Auto
Grandia
Groove Coaster
Ground Control
Growlanser
Guacamelee!
Guardian Heroes
Guild
Guild Wars
Guilty Gear
Guitar Hero
Gunbird
Gundam
Gunpey
Gunslinger Stratos
Gunstar Heroes
Gunvolt

H

.hack
Half-Life
Halo
Hammerin' Harry
Hang-On
Hard Drivin'
Harry Potter
Harvest Moon
Hatsune Miku: Project DIVA
Hat Trick Hero
Hearts of Iron
Hebereke
Heiankyo Alien
Herzog
Hexic
Hidden & Dangerous
Hitman
Homeworld
Horizon
Hotline Miami
The House of the Dead
Hyperdimension Neptunia
Hydlide
Hydro Thunder

I

Icewind Dale
The Idolmaster
Ikari Warriors
Illusion
Image Fight
Imagine
Inazuma Eleven
Infamous
Infinity
Infinity Blade
International Superstar Soccer
Iron Soldier
Itadaki Street

J

Jagged Alliance
Jak and Daxter
Jake Hunter
James Bond
Jazz Jackrabbit
J.B. Harold
Jetpac
Jet Moto
Jet Set Radio
Joe & Mac
Joe Danger
The Journeyman Project
Juiced
Jumping Flash!
Just Cause
Just Dance

K

Kane & Lynch
Katamari
Keyboardmania
Kid Icarus
Kid Niki
KiKi KaiKai
Killer Instinct
Killing Floor
Killzone
Kinect Sports
Kingdom Hearts
The King of Fighters
King's Quest
Kirby
Kirby Fighters
Klonoa
Knights of the Old Temple
Kotoba no Puzzle
Kunio-kun
Kururin
Kyle Hyde

L

Lands of Lore 
Langrisser
The Last Blade
Last Ninja
The Last of Us
League of Legends
Left 4 Dead
Legacy of Kain
Legend of Legaia
The Legendary Starfy
The Legend of Heroes 
Trails
The Legend of Kage
The Legend of Zelda
Hyrule Warriors
Lego
Leisure Suit Larry
Lemmings
Lethal Enforcers
Life Is Strange
Lineage
Lips
LittleBigPlanet
Little Nightmares
Lode Runner
The Lord of the Rings
Lost Kingdoms
Lost Planet
The Lost Vikings
Lotus
LovePlus
Lucky's Tale
Lufia
Luigi
Lumines
Lunar

M

 Madden NFL
 Mafia
 Magical Drop
 Mana
Manhunt
 Maniac Mansion
 Mappy
 Mario
 Dr. Mario
 Mario Kart
 Mario Party
 Mario sports
 Mario RPG
 Mario vs. Donkey Kong
 Super Mario
 Marvel
 Marvel vs. Capcom
 Mass Effect
 Master of Orion
 Math Blaster
 Max Payne
 MechAssault
 MechWarrior
 Medal of Honor
 MediEvil
 Mega Man
 Megami Tensei
 Mercenaries
 Metal Gear
 Metal Max
 Metal Slug
 Metro
 Metroid
 Microsoft Combat Flight Simulator
 Microsoft Flight Simulator
 Midnight Club
 Midtown Madness
 Might and Magic
 Milon's Secret Castle
 Minecraft
 Mirror's Edge
 MLB 2K
 MLB: The Show
 Momoko 120%
 Momotaro Densetsu
 Momotaro Dentetsu
 Monaco GP
 Monkey Island 
 Monster Hunter
 Monster Rancher
 Monster Truck Madness
 Monument Valley
 Mortal Kombat
 Mother
 Motocross Madness
 MotoGP
Moto Racer
 MotorStorm
 Mount & Blade
 Mr. Do!
 Mr. Driller
 MX vs. ATV
 Myst
 Mystery Dungeon
 Myth

N

N
Namco Anthology
Namco Museum
Nancy Drew
Naruto: Ultimate Ninja
NASCAR
Navy Field
NBA 2K
NBA Live
NBA Jam
NCAA Football
Nectaris / Military Madness
Need for Speed
Nekopara
NES Remix
Neutopia
Neverwinter Nights
NFL 2K
NHL (EA Sports) 
Nidhogg
Ni no Kuni
Nights
Ninja Gaiden
Ninja JaJaMaru-kun
Nintendogs
Nobunaga's Ambition
No More Heroes
Numan Athletics

O

Oddworld
Ogre
Ōkami
One Piece
One Must Fall
Onimusha
Operation Wolf
Orcs Must Die!
The Oregon Trail
Osu! Tatakae! Ouendan
Otogi
Otomedius
Outlast
Out Run
Overcooked

P

Pac-Man
Pac-Man World
Panzer Dragoon
PaRappa the Rapper
Parasite Eve
Parkan
Parodius
Patapon
Pathologic
Payday
Peggle
Pengo
Penumbra
Perfect Dark
Persona
Petz
PGA Tour
Phantasy Star
Pikmin
Pillars of Eternity
Pilotwings
Pinball FX
Pirate Ship Higemaru
Pitfall!
PixelJunk
PlanetSide
Plants vs. Zombies
Point Blank
Pokémon
Pokémon Pinball
Pokémon Play It!
Pokémon Puzzle
PokéPark
Pokémon Snap
Pokémon Stadium
Pole Position
Pong
Populous
Portal
Postal
Power Pros
Power Stone
Prince of Persia
Princess Maker
Pro Evolution Soccer
Professor Layton
Project Gotham Racing
Project X Zone
Prototype
Psychonauts
Punch-Out!!
Pushmo
Putt-Putt
Puyo Puyo
Puzzle Bobble
Puzzle & Dragons
Puzzle League

Q

Q*bert
Qix
Quake
Quest for Glory

R

R-Type
Raiden
Railroad Tycoon
Rakugaki Ōkoku
Rampage
Rally-X
Rastan
Ratchet & Clank
RayForce
Rayman
Raving Rabbids
R.C. Pro-Am
Red Dead
Red Faction
Red Steel
Resident Evil
Resistance
Retro Game Challenge
Return Fire
Rhythm Heaven
Rick Dangerous
Ridge Racer
Risen
Risk of Rain
Road Fighter
Road Rash
Robopon
Robot
Robotron: 2084
Rock Band
Rod Land
Rogue Legacy
RollerCoaster Tycoon
Rolling Thunder
Romance of the Three Kingdoms
RPG Maker
Rugby League
Rumble Roses
Rune Factory
Runescape
Rush
Rush'n Attack
Rygar

S

Sabreman
SaGa
Saints Row
Sakura Wars
Salamander
Sam & Max
Samurai Shodown
Samurai Warriors
Sanctum
Scene It?
Schoolgirl Strikers
Science Adventure
Scramble
Scribblenauts
Sea Battle
Seaman
Sega Ages
Sega Bass Fishing
Sega Rally
Sengoku Basara
Senran Kagura
Serious Sam
The Settlers
Shadowgate
Shadow Man
Shadow of the Beast
Shadow Warrior
Shank
Shantae
Shenmue
Shining
Shinobi
Shōnen Jump
Shoot Away
Silent Hill
Silent Scope
Silpheed
SimCity
Simple
The Sims
Sin and Punishment
SingStar
Skate
Skylanders
Sly Cooper
Snake Rattle 'n' Roll
Sniper Elite
Snowboard Kids
SOCOM
Soldier of Fortune
Sonic Blast Man
Sonic the Hedgehog
Soulcalibur
Space Channel 5
Space Harrier
Space Invaders
Space Quest
Speedball
Spider-Man
Splashdown
Splatoon
Splatterhouse
'Splosion Man
SpongeBob SquarePants
Spy Hunter
Spyro
SSX
S.T.A.L.K.E.R.
Star Control
Star Force
Star Fox
Star Luster
Star Ocean
Star Raiders
Star Wars
StarCraft
Star Soldier
StarTropics
State of Decay
SteamWorld
Steel Battalion
Steel Division
Steel Gunner
Story of Seasons
Street Fighter
Streets of Rage
Strider
Strikers 1945
Stronghold
Subnautica
Suikoden
Summon Night
Super Mega Baseball
Super Monkey Ball
Super Robot Wars
Super Smash Bros.
Supreme Commander
Surgeon Simulator
Sutte Hakkun
Swordquest
Syberia
Syphon Filter
System Shock

T

Taiko no Tatsujin
Taito Memories
Tak
Tales
Tank Battalion
Team Fortress
Tecmo Bowl
Teenage Mutant Ninja Turtles
Tekken
Tempest
Tenchu
Terra Cresta
Test Drive
Tetris
Thief
Thunder Ceptor
Thunder Cross
Thunder Force
Tiger Heli
Time Crisis
Time Pilot
TimeSplitters
Titanfall
Tobal
TOCA
ToeJam & Earl
Tokimeki Memorial
Tom Clancy's
Tom Clancy's The Division
Tom Clancy's Ghost Recon
Tom Clancy's H.A.W.X
Tom Clancy's Rainbow Six
Tom Clancy's Splinter Cell
Tomb Raider
Tomodachi Collection
Tony Hawk's
Torchlight
Total Annihilation
Total War
Touch! Generations
Touhou Project
Toukiden
Track & Field
Train Simulator
Transformers
Trauma Center
Trials
Tribes
Trine
Tropico
Truck Simulator
True Crime
Truxton
Turok
Turrican
TwinBee
Twisted Metal
Two Worlds

U

Ultima
Uncharted
Unravel
Unreal
Uridium

V

Valis
Valkyria Chronicles
Valkyrie
Valkyrie Profile
Vampire: The Masquerade
Vandal Hearts
Vanguard
Vectorman
Vib-Ribbon
Viewtiful Joe
Vigilante 8
Violence Fight
Virtua Cop
Virtua Fighter
Virtua Striker
Virtua Tennis
Virtual On
Viva Piñata
V-Rally

W

Wagan Land
The Walking Dead
Wangan Midnight
Warcraft
Warhammer 40,000
Warhammer Fantasy
Wario
WarioWare
Wario Land
Warlords
Wars
Wasteland
Watch Dogs
Wave Race
White Knight Chronicles
Wii
Wild Arms
Wing Commander
Winning Run
Wipeout
The Witcher
Wizardry
Wizards & Warriors
Wolf Fang
Wolfenstein
Wonder Boy
Wonder Momo
Wonder Project
World Heroes
World Stadium
Worms
Wrecking Crew
WWE 2K

X

X (Egosoft)
X (Nintendo)
Xanadu
X-COM
Xeno
Xenogears
Xenosaga
Xenoblade Chronicles
Xevious

Y

Yakuza
Yie Ar Kung-Fu
Yo-kai Watch
Yooka-Laylee
Yoshi
You Don't Know Jack
Ys
Yu-Gi-Oh!

Z

Zanac
Zaxxon
Zero Escape
Zill O'll
Zombie Tycoon
Zone of the Enders
Zool
Zoombinis
Zoo Tycoon
Zork
Zuma
Zumba Fitness

See also

List of best-selling video game franchises
List of longest-running video game franchises
Lists of video games

References